Indothais dubia is a species of sea snail, a marine gastropod mollusk, in the family Muricidae, the murex snails or rock snails.

References

External links
 Schepman M. M. (1919). On a collection of land- and freshwater Mollusca and a few marine Mollusca chiefly collected by Dr. H.A. Lorentz from New Guinea, the Aru Islands, Timor and Borneo. Nova Guinea. Résultats de l'expédition scientifique néerlandaise à la Nouvelle-Guinée en 1912 et 1913 sous les auspices de A. Franssen Herderschee. Vol 8. Zoologie. pp 155-196, pls 4-8

dubia
Gastropods described in 1919